Chiche bombón is a 2004 Argentine romantic drama film directed and written by Fernando Musa. The film stars Iván de Pineda and Andrea Galante. The film is set in San Luis, Argentina, and Andrea Galante portrays a failed actress with diminishing prospects, becoming pregnant and living in poverty.

Cast
Andrea Galante as Chiche
Federico Canepa as  Marianito
Ingrid Pelicori as  Ana
Enrique Liporace as  Manrique
Vivian El Javer as  Hija chusma
Gonzalo Urtizberéa as Concejal Gutiérrez
María José Gabín as Misionera
Juan Carlos Galván as Hombre del comité
Reneé Roxana Darín as Madre chusma
Miguel Dedovich as Tintorero
Oscar Di Sisto as  Hombre anteojos comité
Alicia Muxo as Mujer agencia de empleos
Enrique Biaggio as  Padre Marianito
Ana María Segura as Madre Marianito
Emiliano Montes as Chico plaza
Claudia Retamal as Chica plaza

External links

 

2004 films
2000s Spanish-language films
2004 romantic drama films
Argentine romantic drama films
2000s Argentine films